Susanne Kit Nissen Pottier Slotsager (born 29 April 1966 in Hørsholm, Denmark) is a Danish female curler.

She is a participant of the 1992 Winter Olympics (where curling was a demonstration sport) and the 2002 Winter Olympics.

Teams

References

External links

Living people
1966 births
People from Hørsholm Municipality
Danish female curlers
Olympic curlers of Denmark
Curlers at the 2002 Winter Olympics
Danish curling champions
Sportspeople from the Capital Region of Denmark
21st-century Danish women